La Baume is a commune in the Haute-Savoie department in the Auvergne-Rhône-Alpes region in south-eastern France.

Geography

It is situated in the High Savoy between Thonon-les-Bains and Morzine. According to the French Wikipedia page, it is called 'La Baume' because the church is situated on a rock.

Administration

The current Mayor of La Baume is Jean-François Menoud, elected in 2020.

Demography

Places of interest

The 'Barrage du Jotty', is a dam of the lake of Le Jotty shared by the communes of La Vernaz and La Baume.

See also
Communes of the Haute-Savoie department
Leesville, Texas, its land majorly granted to the late Countship of La Baume

References

Communes of Haute-Savoie